Guglielmo Marsili (born 2 February 1946) is an Italian water polo player. He competed in the men's tournament at the 1972 Summer Olympics.

References

External links
 

1946 births
Living people
Italian male water polo players
Olympic water polo players of Italy
Water polo players at the 1972 Summer Olympics
Water polo players from Naples